Richard Hall was a Jamaican saxophonist who worked with many reggae artists including Peter Tosh and Burning Spear. Nicknamed "Dirty Harry," he also starred in the film Rockers alongside Leroy "Horsemouth" Wallace.

Biography
Former Alpha Boys school student, he was famous for his tenor saxophone playing. In 1974 he played on Jacob Miller's "Keep On Knocking" for Augustus Pablo's Rockers Production team.  In 1975 he was asked to contribute to Burning Spear's Marcus Garvey album which featured the Black Disciples band. He also played on Peter Tosh's hugely successful second solo album, Equal Rights.  The movie Rockers features Richard Hall, alongside Bobby Ellis and Tommy McCook, playing "Satta A Massagana". Richard Hall also appeared on the cover of the VHS release.

Richard Hall was shot and killed at a robbery in Manhattan.

Notes

Year of birth missing (living people)
Jamaican reggae musicians
Jamaican saxophonists
Male saxophonists
Living people
21st-century saxophonists
21st-century male musicians